John Cantwell may refer to:

John Joseph Cantwell (1874–1947), first archbishop of the Roman Catholic Archdiocese of Los Angeles
John Cantwell (bishop of Meath) (1792–1866), Roman Catholic Bishop of Meath
John Cantwell (general) (born 1956), Australian Army officer
John Cantwell (journalist), Australian journalist killed during the Vietnam War
Jonathan Cantwell, Australian cyclist